Andy Creagh (1953 – 10 February 2010) was an Irish hurler and Gaelic footballer who played as a midfielder for the Cork senior football team.

Born in Blackrock, Cork, Creagh first played competitive Gaelic games during his schooling at Coláiste Iognáid Rís. He arrived on the inter-county scene at the age of seventeen when he first linked up with the Cork minor hurling team, before later becoming a dual player at under-21 level. He made his senior football debut during the 1980-81 National Football League. Creagh only played for one season, winning one National Football League medal.

At club level Creagh was a one-time All-Ireland medallist with Blackrock. In addition to this he also won three Munster medals and six championship medals.

In retirement from playing Creagh became involved in team management and coaching. He coached a number of underage and juvenile teams with Blackrock over a long period.

Honours

Team
Coláiste Iognáid Rís
 Simcox Cup (1): 1971
 O'Callaghan Cup (1): 1971

Blackrock
All-Ireland Senior Club Hurling Championship (2): 1972 (sub), 1974 (sub), 1979
Munster Senior Club Hurling Championship (3): 1971, 1973 (sub), 1975, 1978 (sub), 1979
Cork Senior Club Hurling Championship (6): 1971, 1973, 1975, 1978, 1979, 1985 (c)

Cork
National Football League (1): 1980-81
All-Ireland Under-21 Hurling Championship (1): 1973 (sub)
Munster Under-21 Hurling Championship (1): 1973 (sub)
Munster Under-21 Football Championship (1): 1974
All-Ireland Minor Hurling Championship (1): 1971
Munster Minor Hurling Championship (1): 1971

References

1953 births
2010 deaths
St Michael's (Cork) Gaelic footballers
Blackrock National Hurling Club hurlers
Cork inter-county Gaelic footballers
Cork inter-county hurlers
Dual players
Irish schoolteachers